The Hazaras of Afghanistan: An Historical, Cultural, Economic and Political Study is a book about the origins and history of the Hazara people of Afghanistan by Sayed Askar Mousavi.

See also
 The Hazara People and Greater Khorasan by Muhammad Taqi Khavari
 The Hazaras by Hassan Poladi

References

Hazara people
Books about Afghanistan
1997 non-fiction books
Hazara history